The 17th (Service) Battalion, Middlesex Regiment was an infantry battalion of the Middlesex Regiment, part of the British Army, which was formed as a Pals battalion during the Great War. The core of the battalion was a group of professional footballers, which was the reason for its most commonly used name, The Football Battalion (also the footballers' or players' battalion). The 23rd (Service) Battalion, Middlesex Regiment was formed in June 1915 and became known as the 2nd Football Battalion. The battalions fought in the Battle of the Somme in 1916 among others. Soldiers who fought in the 17th and 23rd Battalions included Second Lieutenant Walter Tull, who was possibly the first black infantry officer in the British Army.

History

17th (Service Battalion) 
During the First World War there had been an initial push by clubs for professional football to continue, in order to keep the public's spirits up. This stance was not widely agreed with and public opinion turned against professional footballers. One soldier, serving in France, wrote to a British newspaper to complain that "hundreds of thousands of able-bodied young roughs were watching hirelings playing football" while others were serving their country. The suggestion was even made that King George V should cease being a patron of The Football Association.

William Joynson-Hicks formed the battalion on 12 December 1914 at Fulham Town Hall after Secretary of State for War, Lord Kitchener, suggested it as part of the Pals battalion scheme. England international Frank Buckley became the first player to join, out of thirty players who signed up at its formation. The formation was announced to the general public on 1 January 1915.

During training, the players were allowed leave on a Saturday to return to their clubs to take part in games. However, the clubs found themselves having to subsidise the train fares as the Army did not pay for them.

By the following March, 122 professional footballers had signed up for the battalion, which led to press complaints as there were some 1800 eligible footballers. These recruits included the whole of Clapton Orient (later to be known as Leyton Orient) – the entire Heart of Midlothian team had signed up for the 16th Royal Scots ('McCrae's Battalion') prior to the formation of the football battalion. In addition to footballers, officials and referees also joined the 17th, along with football fans themselves. Many football players deliberately chose to avoid the battalion by joining other regiments, causing the War Office to initially have difficulties filling the battalion.

A number of decorations were issued to the soldiers with the battalion. Lyndon Sandoe, of Cardiff City, was awarded the Distinguished Conduct Medal with bar, and the Military Medal. Northampton Town's Walter Tull became the first Black infantry officer in the British Army. The battalion suffered heavy losses, including at the Battle of Delville Wood and the Battle of Guillemont during the Battle of the Somme. During the First World War, the battalion lost more than a thousand men, including 462 in one battle alone at the Battle of Arras in 1917.

The 17th was assigned to the 6th Infantry Brigade, part of the 2nd Infantry Division.

23rd (Service Battalion) 
A second football battalion, the 23rd (Service) Battalion was formed in June 1915. Former Tottenham Hotspur and Clapton Orient footballer Alan Haig-Brown was appointed commanding officer in September 1916.

The 23rd was assigned to the 123rd Brigade, part of the 41st Division.

Legacy
A memorial to the Football Battalion was unveiled in 2010 in Longueval, France. It was attended by members of the Football Supporters' Federation and representatives of more than 20 clubs. It had been paid for through donations received from football supporters having been promoted by former professional footballer and SAS soldier Phil Stant. The ceremony was conducted by Father Owen Beament of Millwall and a two-minute silence was initiated by Gareth Ainsworth.

A granite memorial to the three Clapton Orient players who died in the Battle of the Somme whilst members of the battalion was unveiled in 2011, located in Northern France. Over 200 Leyton Orient supporters travelled for the unveiling, which commemorated the lives of Richard McFadden, William Jonas and George Scott.

Key
 Players listed in bold won full international caps.

Playing positions

Soldiers

Officers

Senior non-commissioned officers

Junior non-commissioned officers

Ranks

See also
McCrae's Battalion, the 16th (Service) Battalion of the Royal Scots

Notes

References

Pals battalions
Middlesex Regiment
History of football in the United Kingdom
Military units and formations in London
Military units and formations established in 1914
1914 establishments in the United Kingdom